Pregnancy over the age of 50 has, over recent years, become possible for more women, and more easily achieved for many, due to recent advances in assisted reproductive technology, in particular egg donation. Typically, a woman's fecundity ends with menopause, which, by definition, is 12 consecutive months without having had any menstrual flow at all. During perimenopause, the menstrual cycle and the periods become irregular and eventually stop altogether, but even when periods are still regular, the egg quality of women in their forties is lower than in younger women, making the likelihood of conceiving a healthy baby also reduced, particularly after age 42. The female biological clock can vary greatly from woman to woman. A woman's individual level of fertility can be tested through a variety of methods.

In the United States, between 1997 and 1999, 539 births were reported among mothers over age 50 (four per 100,000 births), with 194 being over 55.

The oldest recorded mother to date to conceive was 73 years, while the youngest mother was 5 years old. According to statistics from the Human Fertilisation and Embryology Authority, in the UK more than 20 babies are born to women over age 50 per year through in-vitro fertilization with the use of donor oocytes (eggs).

Maria del Carmen Bousada de Lara is the oldest verified mother; she was aged 66 years 358 days when she gave birth to twins; she was 130 days older than Adriana Iliescu, who gave birth in 2005 to a baby girl. In both cases the children were conceived through IVF with donor eggs. The oldest verified mother to conceive naturally (listed currently  in the Guinness Records) is Dawn Brooke (Guernsey); she conceived a son at the age of 59 years in 1997.

Erramatti Mangamma currently holds the record for being the oldest living mother who gave birth at the age of 73 through in-vitro fertilisation via caesarean section in the city of Hyderabad, India. She delivered twin baby girls, making her also the oldest mother to give birth to twins.
The previous record for being the oldest living mother was held by Daljinder Kaur Gill from Amritsar, India who gave birth to a baby boy at age 72 through in-vitro fertilisation.

Age considerations 
Menopause typically occurs between 44 and 58 years of age. DNA testing is rarely carried out to confirm claims of maternity at advanced ages, but in one large study, among 12,549 African and Middle Eastern immigrant mothers, confirmed by DNA testing, only two mothers were found to be older than fifty; the oldest mother being 52.1 years at conception (and the youngest mother 10.7 years old).

Medical considerations 
The risk of pregnancy complications increases as the mother's age increases. Risks associated with childbearing over the age of 50 include an increased incidence of gestational diabetes, hypertension, delivery by caesarean section, miscarriage, preeclampsia, and placenta previa. In comparison to mothers between 20 and 29 years of age, mothers over 50 are at almost three times the risk of low birth weight, premature birth, and extremely premature birth; their risk of extremely low birth weight, small size for gestational age, and fetal mortality was almost double.

Cases of pregnancy over age 50

Debate 
Pregnancies among older women have been a subject of controversy and debate. Some argue against motherhood late in life on the basis of the health risks involved, or out of concern that an older mother might not be able to give proper care for a child as she ages, while others contend that having a child is a fundamental right and that it is commitment to a child's wellbeing, not the parents' ages, that matters.

A survey of attitudes towards pregnancy over age 50 among Australians found that 54.6% believed it was acceptable for a postmenopausal woman to have her own eggs transferred and that 37.9% believed it was acceptable for a postmenopausal woman to receive donated ova or embryos.

Governments have sometimes taken actions to regulate or restrict later-in-life childbearing. In the 1990s, France approved a bill which prohibited postmenopausal pregnancy, which the French Minister of Health at the time, Philippe Douste-Blazy, said was "... immoral as well as dangerous to the health of mother and child". In Italy, the Association of Medical Practitioners and Dentists prevented its members from providing women aged 50 and over with fertility treatment. Britain's then-Secretary of State for Health, Virginia Bottomley, stated, "Women do not have the right to have a child; the child has a right to a suitable home". However, in 2005, age restrictions on IVF in the United Kingdom were officially withdrawn.

Legal restrictions are only one of the barriers confronting women seeking IVF, as many fertility clinics and hospitals set age limits of their own.

See also
List of oldest fathers
List of people with the most children
List of multiple births
List of youngest birth fathers
List of youngest birth mothers
Mother
Pregnancy
Sexuality in older age

References 

Biological records
Gerontology
50
Lists of superlatives
Lists of mothers
Sexuality and age